Real Shadai (1979–2004) was an American-born Thoroughbred racehorse who raced in France and became a leading sire in Japan.

Background
He was sired by Epsom Derby winner Roberto out of the U.S. Racing Hall of Fame mare Desert Vixen.

Real Shadai was bred by Franklin Groves' North Ridge Farm near Lexington, Kentucky, and sold at the 1980 Keeneland July yearling sale for $360,000 to the renowned Japanese horseman Zenya Yoshida. As he had done before with his Champion colt Northern Taste, Yoshida turned Real Shadai over to trainer John Cunnington, Jr. at the Great Stables in Chantilly.

Racing career
In 1981, Real Shadai was a non-winner in his two starts at age two. Out of his six races the following year, he won two, the most important of which was the 1982Grand Prix de Deauville. His other significant outing was a second-place finish in the 1982 GI Prix du Jockey Club to Robert Sangster's colt Assert.

Entered in the 1982 Prix de l'Arc de Triomphe, Real Shadai was up against a very strong field that included Assert along with Ardross, April Run, Akiyda, and one of the great international racing fillies of all time, All Along. After finishing fifth to winner Akiyda, Real Shadai was retired from racing.

Stud record
Sent to stand at stud at his owner's Shadai Stallion Station in Shiraoi, Hokkaido, Real Shadai had a successful career as a stallion. He was the leading sire in Japan in 1993, and his progeny earned in excess of US$110 million. Among his notable offspring were Shadai Kagura, Japan's Champion Three-Year-Old Filly in 1989 and winner of the Oka Sho (Japanese 1000 Guineas), as well as Rice Shower, who captured the 1992 Domestic Grade I Kikuka Sho (Japanese St. Leger) and was a two-time winner of the Domestic Grade I Tenno Sho (Spring) (1993, 1995).

Pensioned in 2000, Real Shadai  became afflicted with hyposthenia, brought on by laminitis, and died at the age of twenty-five on May 26, 2004.

References
 Real Shadai's pedigree and partial racing stats
 2004 obituary with photo for Real Shadai at The Japan Association for International Horse Racing website.

1979 racehorse births
2004 racehorse deaths
Racehorses bred in Kentucky
Racehorses trained in France
Thoroughbred family 2-c